The Beigan Power Plant is a diesel-fuel power plant in Beigan Township, Lienchiang County, Taiwan.

History
The power plant was commissioned on 1 July 1974.

See also

 List of power stations in Taiwan
 Electricity sector in Taiwan

References

1974 establishments in Taiwan
Beigan Township
Buildings and structures in Lienchiang County
Energy infrastructure completed in 1974
Oil-fired power stations in Taiwan